Năsăud County is one of the historic counties of Transylvania, Romania. The county seat was Bistrița.

Geography
Năsăud County was located in the north-central part of Greater Romania, in the north of Transylvania, covering . Currently, the territory that comprised Năsăud County is mostly included in the Bistrița-Năsăud County, while its eastern part belongs now to Suceava County. 

In the interwar period, the county was bordered on the south by Mureș County and a small part of Cluj County, to the west by Someș County, to the north by Maramureș County, and to the east by the counties of Câmpulung and Neamț.

History
The territory of Năsăud County was ceded to Romania by Hungary, as successor state to Austria-Hungary in the Treaty of Trianon (1920). Prior to then, the territory formed Beszterce-Naszód County in the Kingdom of Hungary. Romanian authorities established the county in 1925.

In 1938, the county was disestablished and incorporated into the newly formed Ținutul Mureș. In September 1940, following the Second Vienna Award, the county was annexed by Hungary and incorporated into a re-formed Beszterce-Naszód County until 1944.

Administrative organization

Administratively, Năsăud County was originally divided into four districts (plăși): 
Plasa Bârgău
Plasa Năsăud
Plasa Rodna
Plasa Șieu

Subsequently, the number of districts in the county became six, by setting up two new districts:
Plasa Centrală
Plasa Lechința

Population 
According to the 1930 census data, the county population was 144,131, ethnically divided as follows: 71.5% Romanians, 14.4% Germans, 5.2% Hungarians, 4.4% Jews, 4.1% Romanies, as well as other minorities. Categorized by mother tongue, the population spoke Romanian (73.9%), German (14.6%), Hungarian (5.0%), Yiddish (4.1%), as well as other minority languages. From the religious point of view, the population was 60.2% Greek Catholic, 15.5% Lutheran, 13.8% Eastern Orthodox, 4.4% Jewish, 3.6% Reformed, 2.3% Roman Catholic, as well as other minorities.

Urban population 
In 1930, the county's urban population was 17,640, ethnically divided as follows: 48.4% Romanians, 25.8% Germans, 14.7% Jews, 8.3% Hungarians, as well as other minorities. Categorized by mother tongue, the population spoke Romanian (48.5%), German (26.9%), Yiddish (13.9%), Hungarian (9.0%), as well as other minority languages. From the religious point of view, the urban population was composed of 38.7% Greek Catholic, 23.8% Lutheran, 14.9% Jewish, 10.4% Eastern Orthodox, 6.5% Roman Catholic, 5.3% Reformed, as well as other minorities.

References

External links

  Năsăud County on memoria.ro

Former counties of Romania
Geography of Transylvania
1925 establishments in Romania
1938 disestablishments in Romania
1945 establishments in Romania
1950 disestablishments in Romania
States and territories established in 1925
States and territories disestablished in 1938
States and territories established in 1945
States and territories disestablished in 1950